Casa de Piedra may refer to:

 Casa de Piedra, La Paz, Catamarca, Argentina
 Casa de Piedra, Santa María, Catamarca, Argentina
 Casa de Piedra, La Pampa, Argentina
 Casa de Piedra (Aguadilla, Puerto Rico), a historical building
 The Thacher School, nicknamed Casa de Piedra, in Ojai, California, United States